The North Eastern Railway Class T2, classified as Class Q6 by the LNER, is a class of 0-8-0 steam locomotive designed for heavy freight, especially for hauling long coal trains to various collieries in the North Eastern region of the UK, with a maximum speed of 40 miles per hour.  120 were built at Darlington Works and Armstrong Whitworth between 1913 and 1921 to the design of Vincent Raven, based on the NER Class T and T1 (LNER Q5). The batch of fifty built by Armstrong Whitworth from 1919 were A-W's first locomotives to be built, after the conversion of their Scotswood works from ordnance to peacetime production.

Numbering
All passed into British Railways ownership in 1948 and they were numbered 63340-63459.

Disposal
63372 was withdrawn in 1960 after an accident. General withdrawals were from 1963 to 1967. 63395 has survived into preservation.

Preservation
One, 2238 (LNER 1946 number 3395; BR 63395) has survived to preservation on the North Yorkshire Moors Railway. It is owned by the North Eastern Locomotive Preservation Group (NELPG), who purchased from Hughes Bolckow scrapyard in 1967, and was withdrawn from service in January 2017 to await boiler overhaul. This overhaul was completed in September 2018, with the locomotive being completed just in time to visit the Severn Valley Railway for their Autumn Steam Gala.

Gallery

References

External links 

 LNER encyclopedia
 Class Q6 Details at Rail UK
 North Eastern Locomotive Preservation Group
 North Yorkshire Moors Railway
 North Eastern Railway Class T2 at Eisenbahn in Großbritannien 

0-8-0 locomotives
T2
Railway locomotives introduced in 1913
Armstrong Whitworth locomotives
Standard gauge steam locomotives of Great Britain
Freight locomotives